The 2009 India Open Grand Prix also known as Jaypee Cup Syed Modi Memorial India Grand Prix was a badminton tournament which took place at Babu Banarasi Das Indoor Stadium in Lucknow, India from 15 to 20 December 2009. It is the first time this tournament was ranked as BWF Grand Prix event with a total purse of $50,000. It was the last tournament of the 2009 BWF Grand Prix Gold and Grand Prix.

Men's singles

Seeds

 Chetan Anand (champion)
 Arvind Bhat (third round)
 Andre Kurniawan Tedjono (quarter-finals)
 Parupalli Kashyap (quarter-finals)
 Dionysius Hayom Rumbaka (final)
 Anup Sridhar (quarter-finals)
 Anand Pawar (withdrew)
 R. M. V. Gurusaidutt (semi-finals)

Finals

Women's singles

Seeds

 Saina Nehwal (champion)
 Maria Febe Kusumastuti (semi-finals)
 Maja Tvrdy (second round)
 Aditi Mutatkar (final)
 Fransisca Ratnasari (quarter-finals)
 Jeanine Cicognini (semi-finals)
 Trupti Murgunde (quarter-finals)
 Sayali Gokhale (first round)

Finals

Men's doubles

Seeds

 Akshay Dewalkar / Jishnu Sanyal (final)
 Tarun Kona / Arun Vishnu (semi-finals)
 Mohammad Reza Kheradmandi / Ali Shahhosseini (quarter-finals)
 Alwin Francis / Sanker Gopan (semi-finals)

Finals

Women's doubles

Seeds

 Aparna Balan / Shruti Kurien (quarter-finals)
 Jwala Gutta / Ashwini Ponnappa (withdrew)
 Misaki Matsutomo / Ayaka Takahashi (champion)
 Anjali Kalita / P. Jyotshna (second round)

Finals

Mixed doubles

Seeds

 Valiyaveetil Diju / Jwala Gutta (withdrew)
 Arun Vishnu / Aparna Balan (champion)
 Tarun Kona / Shruti Kurien (final)
 Akshay Dewalkar / Pradnya Gadre (semi-finals)

Finals

References

External links 
Tournament link

Syed Modi International Badminton Championships
India
2009 in Indian sport
Sport in Lucknow
December 2009 sports events in India